Code Red Cloud Nine is the second solo album by Richard Bennett, released on Moderne Shellac in February, 2008.
 "With his latest release, Code Red Cloud Nine, Bennett and his golden tone guitar come swinging back with a dozen unbeatable originals. It's the stuff that dreams are made of....romance, adventure, mystery and danger."
 "I believe these tracks might reflect the real 'heart and soul' of Richard Bennett. Of course, I think that about everything I hear him play, whether it's jazz, blues, country, pop or rock and roll. And perhaps, as someone once said, he plays that way just because he can!"  . . . . Duane Eddy

Track list
"Squisito"
"Something For Tina"
"It's A Lucky Old World"
"Snoozin' At Sue's"
"En Trois"
"When Connie Used To Care"
"April By Twilight"
"Casey's Place"
"Spring Stepped In"
"Samba Soliel"
"Penthouse Prelude"
"Right On The Price, Right On The Corner"

Featuring
 Ted Tretiak - drums
 David Hungate - bass
 Mike Noble - guitar 
 Nick Bennett - guitar
 Richard Bennett - solo guitar

with
 Jim Hoke - alto sax, harmonica, clarinet, flute, tenor sax, string arrangement on It's a Lucky Old World
 Jim Williamson - trumpet 
 Robbie Shankle - English horn
 Bill Huber - trombone
 Tom Hensley - piano
 John Hobbs, Tyson Rogers - hammond organ
 George Bradfute - violin, viola, cello, keyboard, string arrangement on Right On The Price, Right On The Corner
 Jonathan Yudkin - violin, viola, cello
 Kirby Shelstad, Paul Burch, Dave Hoffner - vibes
 Chad Cromwell - drums on Penthouse Prelude
 Byron House - bass on Penthouse Prelude

References

External links
Richard Bennett's personal site

2008 albums
Richard Bennett (guitarist) albums
Albums produced by Richard Bennett (guitarist)